The State University of New York Athletic Conference (SUNYAC) is an NCAA Division III athletics conference consisting of schools in the State University of New York system. It was chartered in 1958 as the New York State Intercollegiate Athletic Conference.

History

Chronological timeline
 1958 - On September 19, 1958, the SUNYAC was founded as the New York State Intercollegiate Athletic Conference (NYSIAC). Charter members included the New York State College for Teachers at Albany (now the University at Albany), the Brockport State Teachers College (now the State University of New York at Brockport), the State University College for Teachers at Buffalo (now Buffalo State College), Cortland State Teachers College (now the State University of New York at Cortland), the New York State College for Teachers at New Paltz (now the State University of New York at New Paltz), the State University College of Education at Oneonta (now the State University of New York at Oneonta), Oswego State Teachers College (now the State University of New York at Oswego), Plattsburgh State Normal and Training School (now the State University of New York at Plattsburgh) and the New York State College for Teachers at Potsdam (now the State University of New York at Potsdam), effective beginning the 1958-59 academic year.
 1959 - Geneseo Normal and Training School (now the State University of New York at Geneseo) and Fredonia State Teachers College (now the State University of New York at Fredonia) joined the SUNYAC, effective in the 1959-60 academic year.
 1963 - The NYSIAC has been rebranded as the State University of New York Athletic Conference (SUNYAC), effective in the 1963-64 academic year.
 1973 - Harpur College (now Binghamton University) joined the SUNYAC, effective in the 1973-74 academic year.
 1978 - The University at Buffalo joined the SUNYAC, effective in the 1978-79 academic year.
 1983 - Women's sports became part of the SUNYAC, effective in the 1983-84 academic year.
 1988 - SUNY Buffalo left the SUNYAC to join the Division I ranks of the National Collegiate Athletic Association (NCAA) as an NCAA D-I Independent, effective after the 1987-88 academic year.
 1991 - The State University of New York at Utica/Rome (now the State University of New York Polytechnic Institute (SUNY Poly)) joined the SUNYAC, effective in the 1991-92 academic year.
 1995 - SUNY Albany left the SUNYAC to join the NCAA Division II ranks as an NCAA D-II Independent, effective after the 1994-95 academic year.
 1997 - SUNY Binghamton left the SUNYAC to join the NCAA Division II ranks as an NCAA D-II Independent, effective after the 1996-97 academic year.
 2007 -The State University of New York at Morrisville (also known as Morrisville State College) joined the SUNYAC, effective in the 2007-08 academic year.
 2008 - SUNYIT left the SUNYAC to join the North East Athletic Conference (NEAC; now known as the United East Conference), effective after the 2007-08 academic year.
 2009 - SUNY Morrisville left the SUNYAC to join the NEAC after a tenure of two seasons, effective after the 2008-09 academic year. But the school has since remained in the league as an associate member from 2009-10 on forward for the sports of field hockey and ice hockey.

Member schools

Current members
The SUNYAC currently has ten full members, all are public schools:

Notes

Affiliate members
The SUNYAC currently has one affiliate member, which is also a public school:

Notes

Former members
The SUNYAC had five former full members, all were public schools:

Notes

Membership timeline

Buffalo left to join the East Coast Conference while reclassifying to Division I and the Mid-American Conference
Albany and Binghamton left to join the New England Collegiate Conference while reclassifying to Division I and the America East Conference 
SUNYIT left to join the North Eastern Athletic Conference
Morrisville State (SUNY Morrisville) left to join the North Eastern Athletic Conference

Conference facilities

Sports

The SUNYAC sponsors intercollegiate athletic competition in the following sports:

See also 

 Hudson Valley Intercollegiate Athletic Conference
 Mid Hudson Conference
 Yankee Small College Conference

References

External links